The following radio stations broadcast on FM frequency 102.9 MHz:

Argentina
 LRA314 Nacional in Santa Fe de la Vera Cruz, Santa Fe
 Radio María in Resistencia, Chaco

Australia
 ABC Goulburn Murray in Alexandra, Victoria
 CAAMA in Coober Pedy, South Australia
 4HTB in Gold Coast, Queensland
 2KKO in Newcastle, New South Wales
 Radio National in Broken Hill, New South Wales
 Radio National in Mackay, Queensland
 SBS Radio in Cootamundra, New South Wales
 Vision Radio Network in Horsham, Victoria
 2ST Southern Highlands - Bowral, New South Wales

Canada (Channel 275)
 CBXR-FM in Fort Fraser, British Columbia
 CBYB-FM in Port Clements, British Columbia
 CFGW-FM-2 in Wapella, Saskatchewan
 CFMO-FM in Collingwood, Ontario
 CFOI-FM-1 in St-Jerome, Quebec
 CFOM-FM in Levis, Quebec
 CHCR-FM in Killaloe, Ontario
 CHDI-FM in Edmonton, Alberta
 CHDR-FM in Cranbrook, British Columbia
 CIAM-FM-1 in Red Earth, Alberta
 CIWS-FM in Stouffville, Ontario
 CJOI-FM in Rimouski, Quebec
 CJOR-FM in Oliver, British Columbia
 CKBB-FM in Sudbury, Ontario-(defunct)
 CKBZ-FM-4 in Clearwater, British Columbia
 CKLH-FM in Hamilton, Ontario
 CKMA-FM-1 in Neguac, New Brunswick
 CKRP-FM-1 in Nampa, Alberta
 VF2583 in Havre St-Pierre, Quebec

China 
 CNR The Voice of China in Tianjin, Huludao and Yan'an
 CNR Business Radio in Changde

Malaysia
 Kelantan FM in Kota Bharu, Kelantan
 Perlis FM in Perlis
 TraXX FM in Johor Bahru, Johor and Singapore

Mexico
 XHCAY-FM in Acayucan, Veracruz
 XHCRG-FM in Ciudad Camargo, Chihuahua
 XHCSBY-FM in Ciudad Valles, San Luis Potosi
 XHEY-FM in Calvillo, Aguascalientes
 XHMG-FM in Monterrey, Nuevo León
 XHNC-FM in Celaya, Guanajuato
 XHRI-FM in Reynosa, Tamaulipas
 XHRPU-FM in Durango, Durango
 XHSCBI-FM in Villahermosa, Tabasco
 XHSCC-FM in San Cristóbal de las Casas, Chiapas
 XHSPRC-FM in Colima, Colima
 XHTNO-FM in Tulancingo, Hidalgo
 XHTOL-FM in Ixtlahuaca, Estado de México
 XHTQE-FM in Tenosique, Tabasco
 XHTS-FM in Veracruz, Veracruz
 XHUIZ-FM in Melchor Múzquiz, Coahuila
 XHVACM-FM in Cuernavaca, Morelos
 XHWJ-FM in Tehuacán, Puebla
 XHXAN-FM in Tacámbaro, Michoacán
 XHYN-FM in Oaxaca, Oaxaca

South Africa
 Star FM 102.9 Mhz

United Kingdom
 Q Radio in Derry, Northern Ireland

United States (Channel 275)
  in Imperial, Nebraska
  in Crowley, Louisiana
 KARN-FM in Sheridan, Arkansas
 KARS-FM in Laramie, Wyoming
 KBIK in Independence, Kansas
  in Berkeley, California
  in O'Neill, Nebraska
  in Sisseton, South Dakota
  in Billings, Montana
 KCUT-LP in Moab, Utah
 KDIF-LP in Phoenix, Arizona
 KDMX in Dallas, Texas
 KDPT-LP in Dos Palos, California
 KEFA-LP in Wenatchee, Washington
  in Cape Girardeau, Missouri
 KFLO-LP in Jonesboro, Arkansas
 KHBZ in Harrison, Arkansas
 KHKO in Prairie City, Oregon
 KHUT in Hutchinson, Kansas
  in Agana, Guam
  in Llano, Texas
  in McFarland, California
  in Hobbs, New Mexico
 KJFA-FM in Pecos, New Mexico
 KLOI-LP in Lopez Island, Washington
  in San Diego, California
 KLTN in Houston, Texas
 KMEZ in Belle Chasse, Louisiana
 KMMO-FM in Marshall, Missouri
 KMNB in Minneapolis, Minnesota
 KNDA in Alice, Texas
 KNFT-FM in Bayard, New Mexico
 KOLZ in Kirtland, New Mexico
 KOUW in Island Park, Idaho
 KOWF-LP in Wichita Falls, Texas
 KOZR-LP in Gentry, Arkansas
 KPIM-LP in Broken Arrow, Oklahoma
 KPOG-LP in Grimes, Iowa
 KQIB in Idabel, Oklahoma
  in Sedona, Arizona
 KRFG in Nashwauk, Minnesota
  in Redmond, Oregon
  in Sioux Rapids, Iowa
 KTOP-FM in Saint Marys, Kansas
 KVAB in Clarkston, Washington
 KVIO-LP in Lubbock, Texas
  in Shreveport, Louisiana
 KVWE in Amarillo, Texas
  in Burlington, North Dakota
  in South Lake Tahoe, California
  in Oxnard, California
 KXOK-LP in St. Louis, Missouri
  in Cedar Rapids, Iowa
 KZTM in McKenna, Washington
 KZWS-LP in Davis, California
 WBCA-LP in Boston, Massachusetts
 WBEI-LP in Charleston, South Carolina
  in Portland, Maine
 WBNU-LP in Framingham, Massachusetts
 WBOO in Reedsburg, Wisconsin
 WBPG-LP in Dorchester, Massachusetts
 WBUZ (FM) in La Vergne, Tennessee
 WBWO-LP in Moundsville, West Virginia
  in Westport, New York
 WCRQ in Dennysville, Maine
  in Springfield, Ohio
  in Camuy, Puerto Rico
  in Hartford, Connecticut
 WDUN-FM in Clarkesville, Georgia
  in Kinston, North Carolina
 WFMA in Marion, Alabama
 WFPR-LP in Franklin, Massachusetts
 WHQG in Milwaukee, Wisconsin
 WIEB-LP in Ocala, Florida
 WJCI in Huntington, Indiana
  in Tice, Florida
  in California, Maryland
  in Raleigh, North Carolina
  in Welch, West Virginia
 WKXX in Attalla, Alabama
 WKYW-LP in Keyser, West Virginia
 WLAS-LP in Auburndale, Massachusetts
 WLKO in Hickory, North Carolina
  in West Liberty, Kentucky
 WLLO-LP in Londonderry, New Hampshire
 WLOJ-LP in Calhoun, Georgia
 WLPP-LP in Palenville, New York
  in New Market, Virginia
  in Philadelphia, Pennsylvania
 WMHR in Syracuse, New York
 WMKB (FM) in Earlville, Illinois
  in Indian River, Michigan
  in Jackson, Mississippi
 WMUU-LP in Madison, Wisconsin
  in Canton, New York
  in Curwensville, Pennsylvania
  in Norfolk, Virginia
  in Crab Orchard, Kentucky
 WPCG-LP in Canton, Georgia
  in Hyannis, Massachusetts
 WQBH-LP in St. Joseph, Michigan
 WQIN-LP in Quincy, Illinois
  in Orangeburg, South Carolina
 WQTS in Statesboro, Georgia
 WRZO-LP in Chambersburg, Pennsylvania
  in Decatur, Illinois
 WVDP-LP in Templeton, Massachusetts
 WVRK in Columbus, Georgia
 WWKJ-LP in Peoria, Illinois
 WWMR in Saltillo, Mississippi
  in Ann Arbor, Michigan
  in Hope, Indiana
  in Delphi, Indiana
  in Jacksonville, Florida
 WYFM in Sharon, Pennsylvania
 WYHA in Grand Rapids, Michigan
 WZEU-LP in Weeki Wachee, Florida
 WZTF in Scranton, South Carolina

References

Lists of radio stations by frequency